Lapsigyrus is a genus of minute sea snails, marine gastropod mollusks or micromollusks in the family Zebinidae.

Species
Species within the genus Lapsigyrus include:
 Lapsigyrus mutans (Carpenter, 1857)
 Lapsigyrus myriosirissa Shasky, 1970

References

 Ponder W. F. (1985) A review of the genera of the Rissoidae (Mollusca: Mesogastropoda: Rissoacea). Records of the Australian Museum supplement 4: 1-221

Zebinidae